Yellow & Green might refer to:

 Yellow & Green (Ron Carter album), 1976
 Yellow & Green (Baroness album), 2012
 Yellow-and-green lorikeet (citrine lorikeet or Trichoglossus flavoviridis), a parrot of Indonesia

See also
 Yellow
 Green